Hamlabad (also Romanized as Ḩamlābād) is a village in Sardabeh Rural District, in the Central District of Ardabil County, Ardabil Province, Iran. At the 2006 census, its population was 1,041, in 227 families.

References 

Tageo

Towns and villages in Ardabil County